Rajendra Prasad  (3 December 1884 – 28 February 1963) was an Indian politician, lawyer, Indian independence activist, journalist & scholar who served as the first President of India from 1950 to 1962. He joined the Indian National Congress during the Indian Independence Movement and became a major leader from the region of Bihar and Maharashtra. A supporter of Mahatma Gandhi, Prasad was imprisoned by British authorities during the Salt Satyagraha of 1931 and the Quit India movement of 1942.  After the constituent assembly 1946 elections, Prasad served as Minister of Food and Agriculture in the central government. Upon independence in 1947, Prasad was elected as President of the Constituent Assembly of India, which prepared the Constitution of India and served as its provisional Parliament.

When India became a republic in 1950, Prasad was elected as its first president by the Constituent Assembly. As president, Prasad established a tradition for non - partisanship and independence for the office-bearer and retired from Congress party politics. Although a ceremonial head of state, Prasad encouraged the development of education in India and advised the Nehru government on several occasions. In 1957, Prasad was re-elected to the presidency, becoming the only president to serve two full terms. Prasad stayed in office for the longest term of around 12 years. Post the completion of his tenure, he quit the Congress and set up new guidelines for parliamentarians which are still followed.

Early life
Rajendra Prasad was born in a Kayastha family in Ziradei, in the Siwan district of Bihar during the British Raj. His father, Mahadev Sahai Srivastava, was a scholar of both Sanskrit and Persian languages. His mother, Kamleshwari Devi, was a devout woman who would tell stories from the Ramayana and Mahabharata to her son. He was the youngest child and had one elder brother and three elder sisters. His mother died when he was a child, and his elder sister then took care of him.

Student life
After the completion of traditional elementary education, he was sent to the Chapra District School. Meanwhile, in June 1896, at the early age of 12, he was married to Rajavanshi Devi. He, along with his elder brother, Mahendra Prasad, then went to study at T.K. Ghosh's Academy in Patna for a period of two years. He secured first in the entrance examination to the University of Calcutta and was awarded Rs. 30 per month as a scholarship.

Prasad joined the Presidency College, Calcutta in 1902, initially as a science student. He passed the F. A. under the University of Calcutta in March 1904 and then graduated with a first division from there in March 1905. Impressed by his intellect, an examiner once commented on his answer sheet that the "examinee is better than examiner". Later he decided to focus on the study of arts and did his M.A. in Economics with a first division from the University of Calcutta in December 1907. There he lived with his brother in the Eden Hindu Hostel. A devoted student as well as a public activist, he was an active member of The Dawn Society. It was due to his sense of duty towards his family and education that he refused to join Servants of India Society, as it was during that time when his mother had died as well as his sister became a widow at the age of nineteen and had to return to her parents' home. Prasad was instrumental in the formation of the Bihari Students Conference in 1906 in the hall of Patna College. It was the first organisation of its kind in India and produced important leaders from Bihar like Anugrah Narayan Sinha and Krishna Singh who played a prominent role in the Champaran Movement and Non-cooperation Movement.

Career

As a teacher

Prasad served in various educational institutions as a teacher. After completing his M.A in economics, he became a professor of English at the Langat Singh College of Muzaffarpur in Bihar and went on to become the principal. However, later on he left the college to undertake legal studies and entered the Ripon College, Calcutta (now the Surendranath Law College). In 1909, while pursuing his law studies in Kolkata he also worked as Professor of Economics at Calcutta City College.

As a lawyer
In 1915, Prasad appeared in the examination of master's in law from the Department of Law, University of Calcutta, passed the examination and won a gold medal. He completed his Doctorate in Law from Allahabad University.In 1916, he joined the High Court of Bihar and Odisha. In 1917, he was appointed as one of the first members of the Senate and of the Patna University. He also practised law at Bhagalpur, the famous silk town in Bihar.

Role in the freedom Movement
Prasad had a major role in the Independence Movement. Prasad's first association with Indian National Congress was during 1906 annual session organised in Calcutta, where he participated as a volunteer, while studying in Calcutta. Formally, he joined the Indian National Congress in the year 1911, when the annual session was again held in Calcutta. During the Lucknow Session of Indian National Congress held in 1916, he met Mahatma Gandhi. During one of the fact-finding missions at Champaran, Mahatma Gandhi asked him to come with his volunteers. He was so greatly moved by the dedication, courage and conviction of Mahatma Gandhi that as soon as the motion of Non-Cooperation was passed by Indian National Congress in 1920, he retired from his lucrative career of lawyer as well as his duties in the university to aid the movement.

He also responded to the call by Gandhi to boycott Western educational establishments by asking his son, Mrityunjaya Prasad, to drop out of his studies and enrol himself in Bihar Vidyapeeth, an institution he along with his colleagues founded on the traditional Indian model.

During the course of the independence movement, he interacted with Rahul Sankrityayan, a writer, and polymath. Rahul Sankrityayan was greatly influenced by Prasad's intellectual powers, finding him to be a guide and guru. In many of his articles he mentioned about his meeting with Sankrityayan and narrated about his meetings with Sankrityayan. He wrote articles for the revolutionary publications Searchlight and the Desh and collected funds for these papers. He toured widely, explaining, lecturing, and exhorting the principles of the independence movement.

He took an active role in helping people affected by the 1914 floods that struck Bihar and Bengal. When an earthquake affected Bihar on 15 January 1934, Prasad was in jail. During that period, he passed on the relief work to his close colleague Anugrah Narayan Sinha. He was released two days later and set up Bihar Central Relief Committee on 17 January 1934 and took on the task of raising funds to help the affected people. After the 31 May 1935 Quetta earthquake, when he was forbidden to leave the country due to government's order, he set up the Quetta Central Relief Committee in Sindh and Punjab under his own presidency.

He was elected as the President of the Indian National Congress during the Bombay session in October 1934. He again became the president when Subhash Chandra Bose resigned in 1939. On 8 August 1942, Congress passed the Quit India Resolution in Bombay which led to the arrest of many Indian leaders. Prasad was arrested in Sadaqat Ashram, Patna and sent to Bankipur Central Jail. After remaining incarcerated for nearly three years, he was released on 15 June 1945.

After the formation of Interim Government of 12 nominated ministers under the leadership of Jawaharlal Nehru on 2 September 1946, he was allocated the Food and Agriculture department. He was elected as the President of Constituent Assembly on 11 December 1946.  On 17 November 1947 he became Congress President for a third time after J. B. Kripalani submitted his resignation.

Presidency 

Two and a half years after independence, on 26 January 1950, the Constitution of independent India was ratified, and he was elected as the first President of India. Unfortunately, on the night of 25 January 1950 (a day before the Republic Day of India), his sister Bhagwati Devi died. He arranged her cremation but only after his return from the parade ground.
 
As the President of India, Prasad duly acted as required by the Constitution and was independent of any political party. He travelled the world extensively as an ambassador of India, building diplomatic rapport with foreign nations. He was re-elected for two consecutive terms in 1952 and 1957 and is the only President of India to achieve this feat. The Mughal Gardens at the Rashtrapati Bhavan were open to public for about a month for the first time during his tenure, and since then it has been a big attraction for people in Delhi and many other parts of the country.

Prasad acted independently off politics, following the expected role of the president as required the constitution. Following the tussle over the enactment of the Hindu Code Bill, he took a more active role in state affairs. In 1962, after serving 12 years as the president, he announced his decision to retire. After relinquishing the office of the President of India in May 1962, he returned to Patna on 14 May 1962 and preferred to stay in the campus of Bihar Vidyapeeth. His wife died on 9 September 1962, a month before Indo-China War. He was subsequently honoured with Bharat Ratna, the nation's highest civilian award.

He died on 28 February 1963, aged 78. Rajendra Smriti Sangrahalaya in Patna is dedicated to him.

In popular culture 
Babu Rajendra Prasad is 1980 short documentary film directed by Manjul Prabhat and produced by the Films Division of India which covers the life of the first president of India.

Bibliography

 Satyagraha at Champaran (1922)
 Division of India (1946)
 Atmakatha (1946), his autobiography written during his 3-year prison term in Bankipur Jail
 Mahatma Gandhi and Bihar, Some Reminiscences (1949)
 Bapu Ke Kadmon Mein (1954)
 Since Independence (published in 1960)
Bharatiya Shiksha
At the feet of Mahatma Gandhi

See also
 Shri Krishna Singh (politician)
 Anugrah Narayan Sinha
 Jawaharlal Nehru
 Sarvepalli Radhakrishnan
 List of politicians from Bihar

References

Further reading
 
 Rajendra Prasad, first President of India, by Kewalram Lalchand Panjabi. Published by Macmillan, 1960.
 Rajendra Prasad: twelve years of triumph and despair, by Rajendra Lal Handa. Published by Sterling Publishers,1979.
 Dr Rajendra Prasad, Correspondence and Select Documents, by Rajendra Prasad, Valmiki Choudhary. Published by Allied Publishers, 1984. .  Excerpts (Vol. 1-Vol. 10)
 Dr Rajendra Prasad by India Parliament. Lok Sabha. Published by Lok Sabha Secretariat, 1990.
 Rajendra Prasad and the Indian freedom struggle, 1917–1947, by Nirmal Kumar. Published by Patriot Publishers, 1991. .
 Dr Rajendra Prasad: Political Thinkers Of Modern India, by V. Grover. Published by Deep & Deep Publications, 1993.
 First Citizens of India, Dr Rajendra Prasad to Dr Shanker Dayal Sharma: Profile and Bibliography, by A. B. Kohli. Published by Reliance Pub. House, 1995. .

External links

 
 

1884 births
1963 deaths
Presidency University, Kolkata alumni
Surendranath College alumni
Indian Hindus
Indian independence activists from Bihar
20th-century Indian lawyers
Members of the Constituent Assembly of India
People from Siwan district
Recipients of the Bharat Ratna
Presidents of India
Presidents of the Indian National Congress
University of Calcutta alumni
Surendranath Law College alumni
Academic staff of the University of Calcutta
Academic staff of City College, Kolkata
Members of the Council of the Governor General of India